The Third Position Party (P3P) is a minor Peronist political party in Argentina. It was founded in 2015 by congresswoman Graciela Camaño and union leader Luis Barrionuevo as a split from the Justicialist Party. It supported Sergio Massa's unsuccessful presidential bid in 2015, and it is currently part of the Federal Consensus coalition. As Camaño is a sitting member of the Argentine Chamber of Deputies, the party counts with representation at the federal level. 

The party's electoral debut was in 2013, when Barrionuevo ran for Congress in his native Catamarca in coalition with the Renewal Front; Barrionuevo was not elected. Since then, only Camaño has achieved electoral wins at the federal level, securing a seat in Buenos Aires Province in 2015 and 2019.

Electoral performance

President

Chamber of Deputies

References

External links
@partido3p on Twitter

Political parties established in 2013
2013 establishments in Argentina
Peronist parties and alliances in Argentina